Francisco Javier Guirado Garcia (born 24 November 1985) is a Spanish male weightlifter, competing in the 56 kg category and representing Spain at international competitions. He competed at world championships, most recently at the 2011 World Weightlifting Championships.

Major results

Notes

References

External links
 Men under 56kg Weightlifting LXXV World Championship 2006 Santo Domingo (DOM)
 2006 World weightlifting men 56kg
 
 

1985 births
Living people
Spanish male weightlifters
Place of birth missing (living people)
21st-century Spanish people